Harley Webster may refer to:

 Phrase (rapper) (Harley Webster, born 1981), Australian hip hop MC
 Harley Webster (illustrator) (born 1909), Australian  illustrator and conservationist